XHACN-FM is a radio station on 107.1 FM in León, Guanajuato. It is owned by Radio Fórmula and carries its Trión rock format.

History
XEACN-AM 910 received its concession on October 18, 1971. It was owned by Rafael Cutberto Navarro and broadcast with 500 watts from San Francisco del Rincón. In 1988, it was sold to Amplitud Modulada de León, with a further sale in 2001 to Radio Fórmula.

In March 2017, Radio Fórmula launched the Trión format in four cities, including León.

References

External links
Trion Bajio Twitter

Spanish-language radio stations
Radio stations in Guanajuato
Radio Fórmula